Massimo Nistri (born 10 October 1955) is an Italian former backstroke swimmer who competed in the 1972 Summer Olympics.

References

1955 births
Living people
Italian male backstroke swimmers
Olympic swimmers of Italy
Swimmers at the 1972 Summer Olympics
Mediterranean Games gold medalists for Italy
Mediterranean Games medalists in swimming
Swimmers at the 1971 Mediterranean Games
20th-century Italian people